Harlem Renaissance is a live album celebrating saxophonist/composer Benny Carter's 85th birthday recorded in 1992 and released by the MusicMasters label.

Reception

"Harlem Renaissance Suite" won the Grammy Award for Best Instrumental Composition in 1992. AllMusic reviewer Scott Yanow stated "Benny Carter is a true marvel. At the time of this recording (a double CD), the classic altoist was already age 84, yet showed no signs of slowing down either his playing or his writing schedule. For his specially assembled big band and The Rutgers University Orchestra (which includes a full string section), Carter wrote entirely new arrangements that demonstrate that his talents have not diminished with age. ... In addition, Carter's alto is often the solo star although he does not hog the spotlight; it just naturally drifts back to him".

Track listing
All compositions by Benny Carter except where noted

Disc One:
 "Vine Street Rumble" – 11:21
 "Sao Paolo" – 5:05
 "I Can't Get Started" (Vernon Duke, Ira Gershwin) – 5:42
 "Stockholm Sweetnin'" (Quincy Jones) – 5:34
 "Evening Star" – 8:31
 "How High The Moon" (Morgan Lewis, Nancy Hamilton) – 11:02
Disc Two:
 "Tales of the Rising Sun Suite: August Moon" – 4:26
 "Tales of the Rising Sun Suite: Teatime" – 3:51
 "Tales of the Rising Sun Suite: Song of Long Ago" – 5:06
 "Tales of the Rising Sun Suite: Samurai Song" – 3:07
 "Tales of the Rising Sun Suite: Chow Chow" – 9:19
 "Harlem Renaissance Suite: Lament for Langston" – 5:05
 "Harlem Renaissance Suite: Sugar Hill Slow Drag" – 5:04
 "Harlem Renaissance Suite:  Happy Feet" – 6:54
 "Harlem Renaissance Suite: Sunday Morning" – 4:15
 "Harlem Renaissance Suite: Happy Feet-Reprise" – 5:11

Personnel 
Benny Carter – alto saxophone, conductor, arranger
John Eckert, Michael Mossman, Richard Grant, Virgil Jones – trumpet
Benny Powell, Curtis Hasselbring, Dennis Wilson, Eddie Bert – trombone
Ralph Bowen – alto saxophone, flute 
Frank Wess, Loren Schoenberg – saxophone
Jeff Rupert – tenor saxophone
Danny Bank – baritone saxophone, flute
Chris Neville – piano
Remo Palmier – guitar
Lisle Atkinson – bass
Kenny Washington – drums

The Rutgers University Orchestra (tracks 2-1 to 2-10):
Richard Rosolino, Susan Kynkor – horns
Katie Evans – flute
John Atteberry – bassoon
Gloria Agostini – harp 
N. Scott Robinson – percussion
Anna Lim, Grace Lee, Michael Locati, Orlando Wells, Rebecca Engstrom, Ruo Tao Mao, Suzanne Gilman, Amy Hegarty, Brigit Hammerling, Michael Jamanis, Norma Stites, Yi-Wen Jiang – violin
Clifford Young, Harold Levin, Jacqueline Young, Mu Ning – viola
Alex Kramer, Bridget MacRae, Tu Qiang, Wendy Tummon – cello
Jack Hayes – orchestrator

References 

1992 live albums
Benny Carter live albums
MusicMasters Records live albums